Altona Meadows is a suburb in Melbourne, Victoria, Australia,  south-west of Melbourne's Central Business District, located within the City of Hobsons Bay local government area.

Located partly within Altona Meadows, Cheetham Wetlands is a large park with numerous boardwalks traversing its network of lagoons. The wetlands attract large numbers of migratory birds, making it popular with walkers and birdwatchers alike.

History

Altona Meadows Post Office opened on 15 March 1996 as the suburb developed.

Population

The next most common countries of birth were India 4.2%, England 2.6%, Malta 2.5%, Vietnam 2.3% and Philippines 2.1%. 59.6% of people only spoke English at home. Other languages spoken at home included Arabic 3.0%, Vietnamese 3.0%, Maltese 2.7%, Greek 2.5% and Italian 2.4%. The most common responses for religion were Catholic 31.1% and No Religion 24.4%.

Education

Altona Green Primary School
Altona Green Primary School is a state-run primary school established in 1990. In 2020, the school had an enrolment of 388 students from Prep to Year 6, 35.13 equivalent full-time staff; 2 principal class, 21.6 teachers (1 Leading Teacher and 1 Learning Specialist) and Education Support Officers. The school has specialist and support programs for the students, which includes; The Arts, Physical Education, Italian, STEM, Kitchen and Garden program and Literacy Intervention. The school is spacious, safe and well-maintained which attracts students from diverse multicultural and socio-economic backgrounds.

Altona Meadows Primary School
Altona Meadows Primary School is a state-run primary school that first opened in 1982. The school has a stable enrolment of around 350 students from Prep to Year 6. There is a diverse multicultural and socio-economic background. Notable former pupils include Australian rules footballer Daniel Giansiracusa.

Queen of Peace Parish Primary School
Queen of Peace Parish Primary School is a Catholic co-educational primary school. Approximately 560 pupils from grades Prep to 6 are at the school. The school was opened in 1982. In 2011, the new gym was opened, along with a new music and performing arts centre.

Transport

Bus
 Route 411: Laverton Station to Footscray (via Altona Meadows and Altona)
 Route 412: Laverton Station to Footscray (via Altona Meadows and Altona)
 Route 415: Laverton Station to Williamstown (via Altona)
 Route 496: Laverton Station to Sanctuary Lakes
 Route 498: Laverton Station to Hoppers Crossing Station
 Route 944: City to Point Cook (Night Bus Service)

Politics

Altona Meadows falls within the federal electorate of Gellibrand (currently held by the ALP's Tim Watts), the state electorate of Point Cook, as well as the local council area of the City of Hobsons Bay.

Typically for a working-class western suburb of Melbourne, it has consistently been a very safe area for the ALP. However, as new housing estates have been established within the area and it becomes increasingly middle-class, it witnessed some larger-than-average swings towards the Liberals during the Howard years (despite remaining solidly Labor).

Notable residents
 Greg Inglis – Rugby league player

See also
 City of Altona – Parts of Altona Meadows were previously within this former local government area.
 City of Werribee – Parts of Altona Meadows were previously within this former local government area.

References

External links
Cr Tony Briffa JP – Deputy Mayor of the City of Hobsons Bay (includes Altona Meadows)
Hobsons Bay Community Online Forum
Cheetham Wetlands, Parks Victoria

Suburbs of Melbourne
Suburbs of the City of Hobsons Bay